Dravci is a settlement on the right bank of the Drava River at its confluence with the Dravinja in the Municipality of Videm in eastern Slovenia. The area traditionally belonged to the Styria region. It is now included in the Drava Statistical Region.

References

External links
Dravci on Geopedia

Populated places in the Municipality of Videm